Anbalippu is a 1969 Indian Tamil-language film, directed by A. C. Tirulokchandar and produced by S. Gandhiraj. The film stars Sivaji Ganesan, B. Sarojadevi,  Vijayanirmala and Jaishankar. It was released on 1 January 1969, and was a hit at the box-office.

Plot

Cast 
Sivaji Ganesan as Velu
B. Saroja Devi as Valli
Vijayanirmala as Meena
Jaishankar as Raja
Pandari Bai as Raja's mother
M. N. Nambiar as Vasudevan
V. K. Ramasamy as Neelamegam Pillai
T. R. Ramachandran as Nayar
Nagesh as Shanmugam
Sachu as Chandra
Karuppu Subbiah as Thangam
Senthamarai as Veerasamy
Geethanjali as Dancer
Pakoda Kadhar as Shanmugam's sidekick
Loose Mohan as the buyer

Soundtrack 
Music was composed by M. S. Viswanathan and lyrics were written by Kannadasan.

References

External links 
 

1960s Tamil-language films
1969 films
Films directed by A. C. Tirulokchandar
Films scored by M. S. Viswanathan